The Hero of Little Italy is a 1913 American drama film directed by  D. W. Griffith and starring Blanche Sweet.

Cast

See also
 Harry Carey filmography
 D. W. Griffith filmography
 Blanche Sweet filmography

References

External links

1913 films
Films directed by D. W. Griffith
1913 short films
American silent short films
Biograph Company films
American black-and-white films
1913 drama films
Silent American drama films
1910s American films